Aliff Dalam 7 Dimensi is a 2016 Malaysian Malay-language action horror film directed by Faizal Ishak written by Anwari Ashraf and Ashraf Zain and produced by Anwari Ashraf Hashim and Syahrul I. Shariffuddin. It stars Izzue Islam, Juliana Evans, Alif Satar, Man Kadir, Hasnul Rahmat, Kaka Azraff and Aleza Shadan. The film was also executive produced by Najwa Abu Bakar and co-executive produced by Gayatri Su-Lin Pillai and Imillya Irwani Roslan.

Cast 
 Izzue Islam as Aliff Lamin
 Alif Satar as Naim
 Juliana Evans as Anna
 Kaka Azraff as Izreen
 Man Kadir as Pak Zain
 Hasnul Rahmat as Aliff's father
 Aleza Shadan as Aliff's mother

References

External links
 

Malaysian horror films
Malay-language films
2016 films
Astro Shaw films
Tayangan Unggul films
Films directed by Faisal Ishak
2016 comedy horror films